The Astra was an American automobile manufactured in 1920. The car was built by a subsidiary concern of Dorris Motors Corporation, and was shown that year in its native St. Louis, Missouri.  It featured a  wheelbase, a Le Roi four-cylinder engine, and a slightly pointed radiator. Some five or ten units were built before the company failed in June 1920.

See also
List of defunct United States automobile manufacturers

References

 

Vintage vehicles
Defunct motor vehicle manufacturers of the United States